Saang Sulok ng Langit (International title: Heaven's Corner / ) is a 2005 Philippine television drama series broadcast by GMA Network. Directed by Ruel S. Bayani, it stars Maxene Magalona, Raymond Bagatsing and Oyo Boy Sotto. It premiered on January 3, 2005, replacing Leya, ang Pinakamagandang Babae sa Ilalim ng Lupa. The series concluded on August 12, 2005, with a total of 158 episodes. It was replaced by Kung Mamahalin Mo Lang Ako in its timeslot.

Cast and characters

Lead cast
 Raymond Bagatsing as Vergel
 Oyo Boy Sotto as Marky 
 Maxene Magalona as Gemma

Supporting cast
 Jennifer Sevilla as Alona
 Alicia Mayer as Juliana
 Dindin Llarena as Joanna
 Jay Manalo as Dante
 Maggie Wilson as Bettina
 Bing Loyzaga as Odette
 January Isaac as Evelyn
 Karla Estrada as Liana
 Raquel Villavicencio as Amparo
 Rich Vergara as Tommy
 Andrew Shimmer as Nicolo
 Reggie Curley as Ronald
 John Medina as Justin
 Jj Zamora as Butil

Recurring cast
 Harlene Bautista as Ninang
 Jess Lapid, Jr. as Brando
 Ruby Rodriguez as Rosa
 Anton dela Paz as Bojo
 Abigael Arazo as Letlet
 Ira Eigenmann as Alice
 Jacque Estevez as Peachy
 Neil Ryan Sese as Mike
 Vice Ganda

References

External links
 

2005 Philippine television series debuts
2005 Philippine television series endings
Filipino-language television shows
GMA Network drama series
Television series by TAPE Inc.
Television shows set in the Philippines